Sandvatnet or Kaldfjorden or Øyvatnet is a lake in Innlandet county, Norway. The  lake is rather unique because it has three parts and each part has a different name. Sandvatnet is the western part, Kaldfjorden is the central portion and Øyvatnet is the eastern part. The lake lies in Nord-Fron, Sør-Fron and Øystre Slidre municipalities. 

Water enters from the nearby lake Vinstre to the west. The lake marks the northwestern boundary of Langsua National Park.

See also
List of lakes in Norway

References

Nord-Fron
Sør-Fron
Øystre Slidre
Lakes of Innlandet